YES. Snowboards is a manufacturer of snowboards. It was founded in 2009 and is based in Europe.

History
The company was founded by UnInc riders DCP (David Carrier-Porcheron), Romain De Marchi and JP Solberg after leaving Burton Snowboards. They created their own brand in collaboration with Nidecker. The new company established its name in the industry in a relatively short period of time. 

YES. is now part of the Nidecker Group, along with Jones Snowboards, Now Bindings, Nidecker, and Flow.

Models
All YES. models were manufactured in the GST factory in Austria before gradually moving production to the SWS factory in Dubai starting in 2014. The GST factory closed in 2016. The YES. designers receive R&D input of some top-level freestyle snowboarders. The 2016-17 catalog consists of fourteen models, which grew to twenty for 2019-20. YES. has also collaborated with Now Snowboarding on bindings, and Globe International on shoes.

Awards
EUROSima's Breakthrough Brand of the Year 2010.
ISPO Award "Gold Award" for the 20/20 Powderhull, 2015.

References

External links
 YES. Snowboards

Snowboarding companies